Crown Church is a parish church in Inverness in the Scottish Highlands, located at the junction of Midmills Road and Kingsmills Road near the city centre. The first minister (1899–1907) was the Reverend William Todd, renowned for his fervent evangelical preaching. Originally built for the Free Church of Scotland, the church buildings were completed in 1901. By this time the congregation had become part of the United Free Church of Scotland, which in turn united with the Church of Scotland in 1929, thus reuniting Scotland's largest Presbyterian denominations.

In 2004 the congregation had 820 members, making Crown Church the largest Church of Scotland congregation in Inverness in terms of membership. The current minister (since 1998) is the Reverend Dr Peter H. Donald, who is also Vice-Convener of the Church of Scotland's Mission and Discipleship Council.

The designer of the building was Inverness born architect James Robert Rhind, a successful architect who had been trained in his father’s practice. His designs were selected for 7 libraries around Glasgow following Andrew Carnegie’s gift of £100,000 to the city in 1901. His landmark buildings were greatly enhanced by his liberal use of columns, domes and sculpted features. Rhind’s best known buildings in the North of Scotland are the Royal Golf Hotel and the Crown Church, Inverness.

See also
List of Church of Scotland parishes

External links
Crown Church, Inverness
Church of Scotland
Presbytery of Inverness 
Image of Crown Church, Inverness

Inverness
Churches in Inverness
Churches completed in 1901
20th-century churches in the United Kingdom
1901 establishments in Scotland